Jay City is an unincorporated community in Wabash Township, Jay County, in the U.S. state of Indiana.

History
Jay City was founded in 1840, and named from the county in which it is located.

Geography

References

Unincorporated communities in Jay County, Indiana
Unincorporated communities in Indiana